Alexandra Mikhailovna Kollontai (née Domontovich, Домонто́вич;  – 9 March 1952) was a Russian revolutionary, politician, diplomat and Marxist theoretician. Serving as the People's Commissar for Welfare in Vladimir Lenin's government in 1917–1918, she was a highly prominent woman within the Bolshevik party and the first woman in history to become an official member of a governing cabinet.

The daughter of an Imperial Russian Army general, Kollontai embraced radical politics in the 1890s and joined the Russian Social Democratic Labour Party (RSDLP) in 1899. During the RSDLP ideological split, she sided with Julius Martov's Mensheviks against Lenin's Bolsheviks. Exiled from Russia in 1908, Kollontai toured Western Europe and the United States and advocated against participation in the First World War. In 1915, she broke with the Mensheviks and became a member of the Bolsheviks.

Following the 1917 February Revolution which ousted the Tsar, Kollontai returned to Russia. She supported Lenin's radical proposals and, as a member of the party's Central Committee, voted for the policy of armed uprising which led to the October Revolution and the fall of Alexander Kerensky's Provisional Government. She was appointed People's Commissar for Social Welfare in the first Soviet government, but soon resigned due to her opposition to the peace treaty of Brest-Litovsk in the ranks of the Left Communists. She was the only woman other than Maria Spiridonova to play a prominent role during the Russian Revolution.

In 1919, Kollontai founded the Zhenotdel, which worked to improve the status of women in the Soviet Union. She was a champion of women's liberation, and later came to be recognized as a key figure in Marxist feminism.

Kollontai was outspoken against bureaucratic influences over the Communist Party and its undemocratic internal practices. To that end, she sided with the left-wing Workers' Opposition in 1920, but was eventually defeated and sidelined, narrowly avoiding her own expulsion from the party altogether. From 1922 on, she was appointed to various diplomatic posts abroad, serving in Norway, Mexico and Sweden. In 1943, she was promoted to the title of ambassador to Sweden. Kollontai retired from diplomatic service in 1945 and died in Moscow in 1952.

Biography

Ancestry 

Kollontai's father, General Mikhail Alekseyevich Domontovich (1830–1902), descended from a Ukrainian family that traced its ancestry back to the 13th century and Daumantas of Pskov. Her father served as a cavalry officer in the Russo-Turkish War (1877–1878). After his participation in the war, he was appointed Provisional Governor of the Bulgarian city of Tarnovo, and later Military Consul in Sofia. In May 1879, he was called back to St. Petersburg. He entertained liberal political views, favouring a constitutional monarchy like that of United Kingdom. In the 1880s he wrote a study of the Russo-Turkish War of 1877–1878. This study was confiscated by the Tsarist censors, presumably for showing insufficient Russian nationalist zeal. Alexandra's mother, Alexandra Alexandrovna Masalina (Massalina) (1848–1899), was the daughter of Alexander Feodorovich Masalin (Massalin) (1809–1859), a Finnish peasant who had made a fortune selling wood. Alexandra Alexandrovna Masalina became known as Alexandra Alexandrovna Masalina-Mravinskaya after her marriage to her first husband, Konstantin Iosipovich Mravinsky (originally spelled Mrovinsky) (1829–1921). Her marriage to Mravinsky was an arranged marriage which turned out to be unhappy, and eventually she divorced Mravinsky in order to marry Mikhail Domontovich, with whom she had fallen in love. Russian opera singer Yevgeniya Mravina (stage name) was Kollontai's half-sister via her mother. The celebrated Soviet-Russian conductor Yevgeny Mravinsky, music director of the Leningrad Philharmonic Orchestra for fifty years (1938–1988), was the only son of Mravina's brother Alexander Kostantinovich and thus Kollontai's half nephew.

The saga of her parents' long and difficult struggle to be together in spite of the norms of society would color and inform Alexandra Kollontai's own views of relationships, sex, and marriage.

Early life 

"Shura", as she was called growing up, was close to her father, with whom she shared an analytical bent and an interest in history and politics. Her relationship with her mother, for whom she was named, was more complex. She later recalled:

Alexandra was a good student growing up, sharing her father's interest in history, and mastering a range of languages. She spoke French with her mother and sisters, English with her nanny, Finnish with the peasants at a family estate inherited from her maternal grandfather in Kuusa (in Muolaa, Grand Duchy of Finland), and was a student of German. Alexandra sought to continue her schooling at a university, but her mother refused her permission, arguing that women had no real need for higher education, and that impressionable youngsters encountered too many dangerous radical ideas at universities. Instead, Alexandra was to be allowed to take an exam to gain certification as a school teacher before making her way into society to find a husband, as was the custom.

In 1890 or 1891, Alexandra, aged around 19, met her cousin and future husband, Vladimir Ludvigovich Kollontai (9 July 1867 – July/August 1917), an engineering student of modest means enrolled at a military institute. Alexandra's mother objected bitterly to the potential union since the young man was so poor, to which her daughter replied that she would work as a teacher to help make ends meet. Her mother bitterly scoffed at the notion:

Her parents forbade the relationship and sent Alexandra on a tour of Western Europe in the hope that she would forget Vladimir, but the pair remained committed to one another despite it all and married in 1893. Alexandra became pregnant soon after her marriage and bore a son, Mikhail, in 1894. She devoted her time to reading radical populist and Marxist political literature and writing fiction.

Early political activism 

While Kollontai was initially drawn to the populist ideas of restructuring society based upon the Mir commune, she soon abandoned this for other revolutionary projects. Marxism, with its emphasis on the class consciousness of factory workers, the revolutionary seizure of power, and the construction of modern industrial society, attracted Kollontai and many of her peers in Russia's radical intelligentsia. Kollontai's first activities were timid and modest, helping out a few hours a week with her sister Zhenia at a library that supported Sunday classes in basic literacy for urban workers, sneaking a few socialist ideas into the lessons. Through this library Kollontai met Elena Stasova, an activist in the budding Marxist movement in St. Petersburg. Stasova began to use Kollontai as a courier, transporting parcels of illegal writings to unknown individuals, which were delivered upon utterance of a password.

Years later, she wrote about her marriage, "We separated although we were in love because I felt trapped. I was detached, [from Vladimir], because of the revolutionary upsettings rooted in Russia." In 1898 she left little Mikhail with her parents to study economics in Zürich, Switzerland, with Professor Heinrich Herkner. She then paid a visit to England, where she met members of the British socialist movement, including Sidney and Beatrice Webb. She returned to Russia in 1899, at which time she met Vladimir Ilych Ulyanov, better known today as Vladimir Lenin.

Kollontai became interested in Marxist ideas while studying the history of working movements in Zürich, under Herkner, later described by her as a Marxist Revisionist.

She became a member of the Russian Social Democratic Labour Party in 1899 at the age of 27. In 1905, Kollontai was a witness to the popular uprising known as Bloody Sunday at Saint Petersburg in front of the Winter Palace. At the time of the split in the Russian Social Democratic Labour Party between the Mensheviks under Julius Martov and the Bolsheviks under Vladimir Lenin in 1903, Kollontai did not side with either faction at first, and "offered her services to both factions". In 1906, however, disapproving of "the hostile position taken by the Bolsheviks towards the Duma" and despite her being generally a left-winger, she decided to join the Mensheviks.

She went into exile, to Germany, in 1908 after publishing "Finland and Socialism", which called on the Finnish people to rise up against oppression within the Russian Empire. She traveled across western Europe and became acquainted with Karl Kautsky, Clara Zetkin, Rosa Luxemburg, and Karl Liebknecht, among others.

 In 1911, while abruptly breaking off her long-term relationship with her faction comrade Peter Maslov (1867–1946), an agrarian scientist, she started a love affair with another fellow exile, Alexander Gavrilovich Shliapnikov. The couple appeared quite oddly assorted: she was a Menshevik intellectual, of noble origins, thirteen years older than him; he was a self-taught metalworker from provincial Russia and a Bolshevik leading exponent of some prominence. Their romantic relationship came to an end in July 1916, but evolved thereafter into a long-lasting friendship as they wound up sharing many of the same general political views. They were still in contact in the early 1930s when Kollontai lived abroad in a sort of diplomatic exile, and Shliapnikov was going to be executed during the Soviet purges.

With Russian entry into World War I in 1914, Kollontai left Germany due to the German social democrats' support of the war. Kollontai was strongly opposed to the war and very outspoken against it, and in June 1915 she broke with the Mensheviks and officially joined the Bolsheviks, "those who most consistently fought social-patriotism". After leaving Germany, Kollontai traveled to Denmark, only to discover that the Danish social democrats also supported the war. The next place where Kollontai tried to speak and write against the war was Sweden, but the Swedish government imprisoned her for her activities. After her release, Kollontai traveled to Norway, where she at last found a socialist community that was receptive to her ideas. Kollontai stayed primarily in Norway until 1917. She travelled twice to the United States to speak about war and politics, and to renew her relationship with her son Mikhail; in 1916, she had arranged for him to avoid conscription by going to the United States to work on Russian orders from U.S. factories. In 1917, upon hearing of the February Revolution, Kollontai returned from Norway to Russia.

Russian Revolution 

When Lenin returned to Russia in April 1917, Kollontai was the only major leader of the Petrograd Bolsheviks who immediately voiced her full support for his radical and nonconformist new proposals (the so-called "April theses"). She was a member of the Executive Committee of the Petrograd Soviet, and "for the rest of 1917, [she] was a constant agitator for revolution in Russia as a speaker, leaflet writer and worker on the Bolshevik women's paper Rabotnitsa". Following the July uprising against the Provisional Government, she was arrested along with many other Bolshevik leaders, but was given again her full freedom of movement in September: she was then a member of the party's Central Committee and as such she voted for the policy of armed uprising that led to the October Revolution. At the Second All-Russian Congress of Soviets on 26 October, she was elected People's Commissar for Social Welfare in the first Soviet government, but she soon resigned in opposition to the Brest-Litovsk Peace. During the revolutionary period, at the age of 45, she married 28-year-old revolutionary sailor Pavel Dybenko, while keeping her surname from her first marriage.

She was the most prominent woman in the Soviet administration and was best known for founding the Zhenotdel or "Women's Department" in 1919 . This organization worked to improve the conditions of women's lives in the Soviet Union, fighting illiteracy and educating women about the new marriage, education, and work laws put in place by the Revolution. It was eventually closed in 1930.

In political life, Kollontai increasingly became an internal critic of the Communist Party and, with an article published in Pravda on 28 January 1921, she publicly sided with the Workers' Opposition, a left-wing faction of the party that had its roots in the trade union milieu and was led by Shliapnikov and by Sergei Medvedev, both of working class extraction. Just three days earlier, on 25 January, after about a month delay, Pravda had finally published the faction’s platform for the upcoming Tenth Party Congress: it mainly advocated unionized workers' control over factories and generally over "the management of the national economy", on the grounds that the construction of a communist society could only be carried out by the industrial proletariat itself through its class work in history and through the intelligence it would acquire in concrete economic experience.

In the run-up to the congress, scheduled for 8-16 March, at Shliapnikov's urgent request, Kollontai had a pamphlet printed with the title of The Workers' Opposition: it expounded her personal views on the subjects under discussion, was intended to be distributed only to the delegates and has since remained probably her most famous work. "Kollontai’s propositions for reform mostly repeated those enumerated by the Workers’ Opposition, but she placed a greater emphasis on reducing 'bureaucratisation'," and denouncing petty-bourgeois or non-proletarian influences on Soviet institutions and on the party itself. Her language "conveyed much harsher criticism of the party and CC than did Shlyapnikov's language" in the official faction platform. Lenin was very upset about Kollontai joining the Workers' Opposition and, when he was given a copy of her pamphlet, he just 'leafed through' it and immediately castigated Kollontai. He stated she had written 'the platform of a new party', threatened to submit her pamphlet to the court of the Communist International, and said clearly to her face: "For this you should not only be excluded, but shot as well."

The followers of the faction among the delegates, however, remained quite few and proved to be declining during the proceedings, when Lenin did not even hesitate to draw snickers from delegates by hinting at the amatory past of the Kollontai-Shliapnikov couple. On the last day, the congress passed, among others, two secret resolutions: one, specially aimed at the Workers' Opposition, condemned ‘Anarcho-syndicalist deviation’ within the party; the other ('On party unit') simply banned all factions. Thus, the Workers' Opposition was forcibly dissolved, and Kollontai was practically sidelined.

Nevertheless, despite subsequent misunderstandings with the former leaders of the Workers' Opposition and Kollontai's own resentment at their having renounced the pamphlet she had written to support the faction, on 5 July 1921 she tried again "to help [them] by speaking on their behalf to the Third Congress of the Comintern". In her speech, she bitterly attacked the New Economic Policy proposed by Lenin, warning that it 'threatened to disillusion workers, to strengthen the peasantry and petty bourgeoisie, and to facilitate the rebirth of capitalism'. Trotsky retorted by even likening her to "an Amazon", and Karl Radek loudly corrected: "Like a Valkyrie!"

Kollontai's final political action as an oppositionist within the Communist Party was her co-signing of the so-called "letter of the Twenty Two", whereby several former members of the Workers' Opposition and other party members of working class origin appealed to the Communist International against the undemocratic internal practices in use within the Russian party. When 'Kollontai attempted to speak before the Comintern Executive on 26 February 1922 on behalf of the views expressed in the appeal,' Trotsky and Zinoviev had her name removed from the list of orators and insisted that she should not take the floor. When she 'proved recalcitrant, Trotsky forbade her to speak and issued a decree, in the name of the CC, ordering all members of the Russian delegation to "obey the directives of the party".' Predictably, the appeal of the 22 was unsuccessful. At the Eleventh Party Congress (March–April 1922), Kollontai, Shlyapnikov and Medvedev were charged with having insisted on factional work and a three-man commission, Stalin, Zinoviev and Dzerzhinsky, recommended the "unrepentant" three be purged from the party. In her defensive speech before the Congress, Kollontai emphasized her loyalty to the party and her devotion to giving the leading role in the party and outside it to the working class, she proclaimed her full observance of the previous year's decree on party unity, and concluded: "If there is no place for this in our party, then exclude me. But even outside the ranks of our party, I will live, work and fight for the Communist party." Eventually, a resolution was passed allowing the three to remain in the party unless they committed further violations of its discipline.

Soviet diplomatic career 

After the Eleventh Congress, Kollontai became a political outcast. She was badly shaken by having teetered dangerously close to expulsion, and regarded the idea of being excluded from the 'revolutionary community of the elect' as a dreadful "nightmare". She even speculated she might be arrested. Italian writer and former communist leader Ignazio Silone later recounted that, on his departure from Moscow in 1922, Kollontai jokingly warned him not to believe any news of her being arrested for stealing Kremlin silverware, for such news could only mean that she was "not entirely in agreement with [Lenin] about some little problem of agricultural or industrial policy."

During this time, Kollontai was also in the process of a painful divorce from her second husband, Pavel Dybenko, which made her want a change of scenery. In the latter half of 1922 she wrote a "personal letter" to the newly appointed General Secretary of the Central Committee and her recent inquisitor, Joseph Stalin, asking to be sent on a mission abroad. Stalin granted her request and, starting from October 1922, she began to be entrusted with diplomatic appointments abroad and was thus prevented from playing any further political role at home. At first she hoped it was just a passing phase in her life and that she would soon return to her political work in the Zhenotdel, but eventually she had to realize that the diplomatic assignment had become a sort of exile.

Initially, she was sent as an attaché to the Soviet commercial mission in Norway, becoming one of the first women serving in diplomacy in modern times. In early 1924, Kollontai was first promoted to Chargé d'affaires and from August to Minister Plenipotentiary. As such, she later served in Mexico (1926–27), again in Norway (1927–30) and eventually in Sweden (1930–45), where she was finally promoted to Ambassador in 1943. When Kollontai was in Stockholm, the Winter War between Russia and Finland broke out; it has been said that it was largely due to her influence that Sweden remained neutral. After the war, she received Vyacheslav Molotov's praises. During late April 1943, Kollontai may have been involved in abortive peace negotiations with Hans Thomsen, her German counterpart in Stockholm. She was also a member of the Soviet delegation to the League of Nations. Kollontai retired in 1945. In 1946 and 1947 she was nominated for the Nobel Peace Prize by Scandinavian political circles (including the Finnish president and erstwhile ambassador to Moscow, Juho Kusti Paasikivi) on the grounds of "her diplomatic efforts to end war and hostilities between the Soviet Union and Finland during the negotiations in 1940-44."

Political retreat and attitude toward Stalinism 
Being sent abroad in a sort of de facto exile for over twenty years, Kollontai gave up "her fight for reform and for women, retreating into relative obscurity" and bowing to the new political climate. She discarded her feminist concerns and "offered no objection to the patriarchal legislation of 1926 and the constitution of 1936, which deprived Soviet women of many of the gains they had achieved after the February and October Revolutions". The following words she allegedly pronounced in a private conversation with her friend  in 1929 give a suggestion of her attitude towards advancing Stalinism: "Everything's changed so much. What can I do about this? One cannot go against the 'apparatus'. For my part, I have put my principles aside in a corner of my conscience and I pursue as best I can the policies they dictate to me".

Three years earlier, in 1926, when she was requested to write her own autobiography for a series on famous women by Munich publisher Helga Kern, she deemed it necessary to completely revise the first draft of her work she had handed over to the publisher, by deleting practically all references to 'dangerous' topics, as well as the parts mentioning or just hinting at her former critical positions and those having a personal nature that might be regarded as forms of self-celebration. On asking the publisher to make the changes requested, Kollontai apologized with obvious embarrassment, inviting repeatedly to debit her all expenses and writing twice that, under current circumstances, it was not absolutely possible "to do otherwise".

In his memoirs, Leon Trotsky was contemptuously critical of Kollontai's political attitude, writing that 'In Russia, Kolontay took from the very first an ultra-left stand, not only toward me but toward Lenin as well. She waged many a battle against the "Lenin-Trotsky" regime, only to bow most movingly later on to the Stalin regime.' Yet, it could also be argued that she had just internalized for good the lesson Trotsky himself had taught her at the aforementioned 1922 meeting of the Comintern, when he had tamed her last remnants of recalcitrance, forcing her into bowing to party discipline. Kollontai herself had, as it were, countered in advance, in her 1927 article through which she finally aligned herself, once and for all, with the Stalinists:

The degree of her adherence to the prevailing ideas of the Stalinist regime, whether it was spontaneous or not, may be gauged from the opening of an article she wrote in 1946 for a Russian magazine. It bore the title The Soviet Woman — a Full and Equal Citizen of Her Country, and praised the Soviet Union's advances of women's rights, while simultaneously emphasizing a view of the role of women in society at odds with her previous writings on women's liberation.

Death and legacy 
Alexandra Kollontai died in Moscow on 9 March 1952, less than a month from her 80th birthday, and was buried at Novodevichy Cemetery. 

She was the only member of the Bolsheviks' Central Committee that had led the October Revolution who managed to live into the 1950s, other than Stalin himself and his devoted supporter Matvei Muranov. She has sometimes been criticized and even held up to contempt for not raising her voice during the Stalinist purges, when, among countless others, her former husband, her former lover and fighting comrade, and so many friends of hers were executed. And, it has been noted, at the time she "was safe in her sumptuous Stockholm residence". Notwithstanding, it should also be pointed out that, even so, Kollontai did not enjoy a full liberty of action and had to worry about the possible fates of her family. It might not have been pure chance if both her only son and her musician half-nephew (whom she had much supported at the beginning of his career) also came unscathed through the persecution of the Stalinist regime, to the establishment of which she had, however, significantly contributed.

The resurgence of radicalism in the 1960s and the growth of the feminist movement in the 1970s spurred a new interest in the life and writings of Alexandra Kollontai all around the world. A spate of books and pamphlets by and about Kollontai were subsequently published, including full-length biographies by historians Cathy Porter, Beatrice Farnsworth, and Barbara Evans Clements. In 1982 Rosa von Praunheim made the film Red Love based on a novella by Kollontai. For example, the film was shown in the Museum of Modern Art. Kollontai was the subject of the 1994 TV film, A Wave of Passion: The Life of Alexandra Kollontai, with Glenda Jackson as the voice of Kollontai. A female Soviet diplomat in the 1930s with unconventional views on sexuality, probably inspired by Kollontai, had been played by Greta Garbo in the movie Ninotchka (1939).

Contributions to Marxist feminism 

Kollontai is regarded as a key figure in Marxist feminism for her commitment to both women's liberation and Marxist ideals. She opposed the ideology of liberal feminism, which she saw as bourgeois. At the same time, Kollontai was a champion of women's liberation, believing that it "could take place only as the result of the victory of a new social order and a different economic system". She criticized bourgeois feminists for prioritizing political goals, such as women's suffrage, that would provide political equality for bourgeois women but would do little to address the immediate conditions of working-class women, and was further distrustful that bourgeois champions of feminism would continue to support their working class counterparts after succeeding in their struggle for "general women's" rights:

Kollontai is known for her advocacy of free love. However, this does not mean that she advocated casual sexual encounters; indeed, she believed that due to the inequality between men and women that persisted under socialism, such encounters would lead to women being exploited, and being left to raise children alone. Instead she believed that true socialism could not be achieved without a radical change in attitudes to sexuality, so that it might be freed from the oppressive norms that she saw as a continuation of bourgeois ideas about property. A common myth describes her as a proponent of the "glass of water" theory of sexuality. The quote "...the satisfaction of one's sexual desires should be as simple as getting a glass of water" is often mistakenly attributed to her. This is likely a distortion of the moment in her short story "Three Generations" when a young female Komsomol member argues that sex "is as meaningless as drinking a glass of vodka [or water, depending on the translation] to quench one's thirst." In number 18 of her Theses on Communist Morality in the Sphere of Marital Relations, Kollontai argued that "...sexuality is a human instinct as natural as hunger or thirst."

Though Kollontai believed in the eventual obsolescence of the traditional family, she held that institution marriage could survive if it underwent a radical transformation. She advocated for a transformed marriage that would be compatible with many other social relations, such as friendship. Kollontai felt that by liberating women and men from their traditionally hierarchical roles, communism would free marriage from the "conjugal slavery of the past", allowing spouses to thrive in egalitarian marriages grounded in mutual love and trust. As Kollontai wrote in 1920:The workers’ state needs new relations between the sexes, just as the narrow and exclusive affection of the mother for her own children must expand until it extends to all the children of the great, proletarian family, the indissoluble marriage based on the servitude of women is replaced by a free union of two equal members of the workers’ state who are united by love and mutual respect. In place of the individual and egoistic family, a great universal family of workers will develop, in which all the workers, men and women, will above all be comrades. – Alexandra Kollontai (1920), Communism and the FamilyKollontai's saw domestic labour as an impediment to her ideal of the "universal family". Rather than viewing the tasks that were traditionally reserved for women as productive labour, Kollontai believed that housework stood in the way of industrialization and modernization and that under a fully realized communist society, industrial mechanization would ultimately replace so-called women's work:All that was formerly produced in the bosom of the family is now being manufactured on a mass scale in workshops and factories. The machine has superseded the wife. What house- keeper would now bother to make candles, spin wool or weave cloth? All these products can be bought in the shop next door. Formerly every girl would learn to knit stockings. Nowa- days, what working woman would think of making her own? In the first place she doesn’t have the time. Time is money, and no one wants to waste time in an unproductive and useless manner. Few working women would start to pickle cucumbers or make other preserves when all these things can be bought in the shop. – Alexandra Kollontai (1920), Communism and the Family In this regard, Kollontai's critique of women's societal position under capitalism is both reminiscent of and distinct from the Marxist feminist Wages for Housework movement. While proponents of Wages for Housework argue that the domestic labour is productive labour worthy of monetary compensation, Kollontai devalued "women's work", believing it to be an antiquated vestige of the past. Unlike supporters of Wages for Housework who advocated for the integration of women into the public sphere, Kollontai questioned the status of working women: 

Kollontai's views on the role of marriage and the family under Communism were arguably more influential than her advocacy of "free love." Kollontai believed that, like the state, the family unit would wither away once the second stage of communism became a reality. She viewed marriage and traditional families as legacies of an oppressive, property-rights-based, and individualistic past in which women were simultaneously subjected to both wage labour outside the home and unpaid maternal and domestic labour within it. Kollontai admonished men and women to discard their nostalgia for traditional family life. "The worker-mother must learn not to differentiate between yours and mine; she must remember that there are only our children, the children of Russia's communist workers." Under Communism, both men and women would work for, and be supported by, society, not their families. Similarly, their children would be wards of society, raised in common. However, she also praised parental attachment: "Communist society will take upon itself all the duties involved in the education of the child, but the joys of parenthood will not be taken away from those who are capable of appreciating them."

Awards 
 Order of Lenin (1933)
 Order of the Red Banner of Labour (1945)
 Order of St. Olav (Norwegian highest award at the time)
 Order of the Aztec Eagle (1944)

Works 

 "The Social Basis of the Woman Question" ("Социальные основы женского вопроса"), a pamphlet, 1909
"New Woman" ("Новая женщина"), Modern World (Современный мир), 9, 151–185, 1913 (republished in New morality and working class (Новая мораль и рабочий класс), Moscow, 1919, pp. 3–35).
"The Attitude of the Russian Socialists," The New Review, March 1916, pp. 60–61.
 Vasilisa Malygina (Василиса Малыгина). novel, 1923
 Red Love [English translation of Vasilisa Malygina, 1923]. New York: Seven Arts, 1927.
 Free Love. London: J.M. Dent and Sons, 1932.
 Communism and the Family. Sydney: D. B. Young, n.d. [1970].
 The Autobiography of a Sexually Emancipated Communist Woman. n.c. [New York]: Herder and Herder, n.d. [1971].
 Sexual Relations and the Class Struggle: Love and the New Morality. Bristol: Falling Wall Press, 1972.
 Women Workers Struggle for their Rights. Bristol: Falling Wall Press, 1973.
 The Workers' Opposition. San Pedro, CA: League for Economic Democracy, 1973.
 International Women's Day. Highland Park, MI: International Socialist Publishing Co., 1974.
 Selected Writings of Alexandra Kollontai. Alix Holt, trans. London: Allison & Busby, 1977. New York: W.W. Norton & Co.
 Love of Worker Bees [novel]. Cathy Porter, trans. London: Virago, 1977 [new translation of Vasilisa Malygina plus two short stories]
 A Great Love [novel]. Cathy Porter, trans. London: Virago, 1981. Also: New York: W.W. Norton & Co., 1982.
 Selected Articles and Speeches. New York: International Publishers, 1984.
 The Essential Alexandra Kollontai. Chicago: Haymarket Books, 2008.
 The Workers Opposition in the Russian Communist Party: The Fight for Workers Democracy in the Soviet Union. St. Petersburg, FL: Red and Black Publishers, 2009.

See also 

 Zhenotdel
 Kommunistka
 History of feminism
 Women in the Russian Revolution

Notes

References

Bibliography 
 
 
 
 
 Cole, G.D.H. (1958). A History of Socialist Thought, volume IV: Communism and Social Democracy 1914-1931. London-New York: Macmillan-St. Martin's Press, parts I and II
 
 
 
Morrison, Jenny, "Women on the left: Alexandra Kollontai"; Counterfire, 11 February 2012
Ringer, Ronald E. (2006). Excel HSC Modern History. Glebe NSW: Pascal Press (article: "Alexandra Kollontai (1872–1952)", pp. 187–190).

Further reading 
 
 
 
 
 
 
 
 
 
 
 
 Leppänen, Katarina

External links 

 Alexandra Kollontai Internet Archive at Marxists Internet Archive.
 Christine Thomas, "For socialism and women's liberation," (Archived 25 October 2009) Socialism Today, March 2003.
 Helen Ward, "Alexandra Kollontai,"  PermanentRevolution.net
 Gabrille Tousignant, "St-Petersbourg workers of the textile industry," Kollontai.net
 

1872 births
1952 deaths
[
Ambassador Extraordinary and Plenipotentiary (Soviet Union)
Ambassadors of the Soviet Union to Mexico
Ambassadors of the Soviet Union to Norway
Ambassadors of the Soviet Union to Sweden
Burials at Novodevichy Cemetery
Communist Party of the Soviet Union members
Communist women writers
Female revolutionaries
Free love advocates
Left communists
Marxist feminists
Marxist theorists
Mensheviks
Old Bolsheviks
People from Sankt-Peterburgsky Uyezd
Recipients of the Order of Lenin
Recipients of the Order of the Red Banner of Labour
Russian anti–World War I activists
Communists from the Russian Empire
Russian Constituent Assembly members
Feminists from the Russian Empire
Marxist writers from the Russian Empire

Revolutionaries from the Russian Empire
Russian Social Democratic Labour Party members

Novelists from the Russian Empire
Soviet novelists
Soviet politicians
Soviet women diplomats
Soviet women in politics
Soviet women novelists
Soviet women writers
Women ambassadors
Women Marxists
Workers' Opposition
Writers from Saint Petersburg
Magazine founders from the Russian Empire